Al Mayadeen (Arabic: الميادين; The Plazas) is a pan-Arabist satellite news television channel launched on 11 June 2012 in Beirut, Lebanon. Its programming is predominantly news. It has news reporters in most Arab countries. In the pan-Arab TV news market, it competes against Al Jazeera and Al Arabiya, and also against Sky News Arabia and BBC Arabic Television. At its founding in 2012, many of Al Mayadeen's senior staff were former correspondents and editors of Al Jazeera. Al Mayadeen is viewed as pro-Hezbollah and pro-Syrian government.

The channel is part of Al Mayadeen satellite media network, including a production company, a radio station, a website of Arabic, English and Spanish editions, an advertising company and other media-related projects. Besides the headquarters in Beirut, Al Mayadeen has a news network and three regional offices, one in Tunisia, another in Cairo with three reporters and a big studio, and a third in Tehran.

Staff
Ghassan bin Jiddo is the head of the board of directors and program director of the channel. He is the former head of Al Jazeera's Iran and Beirut offices and a former talk show host in the channel. He resigned from the Qatar-based Al Jazeera in 2011, criticizing its reporting of the Syrian civil war. Jiddo seemingly accused Al Jazeera of deviating from "professional broadcasting standards", emphasizing that Al Mayadeen would remain objective and unbiased. Nayef Krayem, the owner of the Lebanon-based Al Ittihad TV and former director of the Hezbollah-affiliated Al-Manar, was designated as the general manager of the channel, but he resigned one month before its launch.

The staff of the channel include Lebanese journalists such as Sami Kulaib, Ali Hashem, the former Al Jazeera war correspondent, who said he resigned from the channel because it refused to broadcast footage of militants on the Lebanese Syrian borders in the early days of the Syrian uprising, Zahi Wehbe, Lina Zahreddine, Lana Mudawwar, Muhammad Alloush, Ahmad Abu Ali and Dina Zarkat. Two Syrian journalists, Ramia Ibrahim and Futoun Abbasi, and two Palestinian journalists Kamal Khalaf and Ahmad Sobh as well as Yemeni Mona Safwan are also among its staff. Like Jiddo, most of the channel's staff are former Al Jazeera correspondents and editors.

George Galloway, a British MP, was a presenter for the channel. He was paid £18,000 for the first four months of 2014, for hosting two programmes a month in Beirut. He continued to present for the station in 2016 and 2017.

The channel has a network of reporters in Palestine (specifically, in Gaza and Ramallah) and also, in Jerusalem. Their task is reported to provide the channel with a daily news section in the news broadcast entitled "A Window into Palestine". In addition, there are reporters of the channel in Amman, Tripoli, Rabat, Khartoum, Mauritania and Comoros. The correspondent of the channel in Damascus was withdrawn in April 2014.

Omar Abdel Qader, a Syrian cameraman working for Al Mayadeen, was killed by a sniper during clashes in Deir Ezzor on 8 March 2014.

Programming
Al Mayadeen is on air for 24 hours daily. As of September 2013, the channel had ten daily news reports and nearly 17 distinct programs. One of its programs is A Free Word, a show hosted by George Galloway. The channel had formerly aired a program, namely Hadeeth Dimashq (Arabic: Damascus dialogue), focusing on the Syrian civil war, until April 2014, when it was discontinued.

In 2022, it broadcast a three-hour interview with Hezbollah leader Hassan Nasrallah to mark the 40th anniversary of the group.

Political alignment
The name of the channel, Al Mayadeen, means "the squares" in English, indicating its objective "to provide coverage for the Arab popular actions on the squares of change in the context of the Arab spring revolutions". The channel states that it provides journalism, which is "committed to nationalist, pan-Arab and humanitarian issues within the template of professional journalistic objectivity". In addition, it presents itself as a "free and independent media project" with 500 staff and reporters in Arab and Western capitals. Its slogan is "Reality as it is" and its editorial policy emphasizes that Palestine and resistance movements wherever they are found are its point of reference. Following its first year of broadcast the channel began to be described as the "anti-Al Jazeera".

France 24 and Mohammed Al Jazairy of Asharq Alawsat state that Al Mayadeen represents the latest expansion of Iran, Syria and Hezbollah in the field of media. Shortly after its launch the channel became one of the supporters of Hezbollah. The same view was also expressed in a 2021 publication. Joe Khalil, the author of a book about television in the Arab world, told The Daily Telegraph newspaper that the station is undoubtedly supportive of Assad. According to the Jewish Chronicle, its director, Ghassan bin Jiddo, has spoken of his “friendship” with Hezbollah leader Hassan Nasrallah.

Al Mayadeen refers to the rebels in Syria as "terrorists", and to the actions of the Syrian government against the rebels as "cleansing" when reporting the Syrian civil war.

On 6 November 2015, the Saudi-controlled Arabsat satellite TV organization suspended and banned Al Mayadeen from broadcasting on its satellite system.

The network has been accused of antisemitism. According to the Jewish Chronicle, among articles on its Arabic website are ones entitled “The Holocaust — that great deception”, “Why do the Jews rejoice at the burning of Notre Dame in Paris?”, “Jews and Freemasons in the Arabs’ revolutions”, and “The Jews of ‘Israel’ — this is why their end is certain”. According to Media Matters for America in 2021, Al Mayadeen used antisemitic conspiracy theories about George Soros in its coverage of the Pandora Papers "to sow doubt about whistleblowers and leaks".

The network stated that the Palestinian cause is the channel's centerpiece.

In September 2022, during the 2022 Russian invasion of Ukraine, Al Mayadeen spoke to Russian sources about setbacks in eastern Ukraine. It has referred to the Government of Ukraine as a "Nazi regime" and promoted the discredited Ukraine bioweapons conspiracy theory. British politician Jeremy Corbyn was criticised by Joan Ryan and the Simon Wiesenthal Center for appearing on the network during the war because of its perceived closeness to Iran and Hezbollah.

Writing in Al Mayadeen in October 2022, Janna Al Kadri said that the death of Mahsa Amini in Iran was used by the West as an "opportunity to fuel Iran-phobia and Islamophobia". Al Kadri described the hijab as "a symbol of the working class in its struggle for autonomy against the ongoing and impending assaults of imperialism".

Ownership
The channel says that its owners are anonymous Arab businessmen. There is speculation about the funding of the channel. Many see the channel as a propaganda platform for Iran and Hezbollah and is funded by them. Omar Ibhais, a freelance Lebanese TV producer, stated that the channel is a joint venture between the Iranians and Rami Makhlouf, cousin of Syrian President Bashar Assad. According to the Telegraph, its head of news is married to a former adviser to Assad. However, Ghassan bin Jiddo, director of the channel, denied this and stated that the channel is funded by Arab businessmen whose identity he would not disclose.

References

External links

2012 establishments in Lebanon
24-hour television news channels
Arabic-language television stations
Mass media in Beirut
Television channels and stations established in 2012
Television stations in Lebanon